Carex ascotreta is a tussock-forming perennial in the family Cyperaceae. It is native to eastern parts of the Asia.

See also
 List of Carex species

References

ascotreta
Plants described in 1897
Taxa named by Adrien René Franchet
Flora of China
Flora of Japan
Flora of Korea
Flora of Taiwan
Flora of the Philippines